The men's 200 metres at the 2022 World Athletics Championships was held at the Hayward Field in Eugene from 18 to 21 July 2022.

Summary

A cramp in the semi-final round quashed Fred Kerley's bid to win a medal in all three sprint events. The Olympic Gold Medalist Andre De Grasse did not start in the heats, #2 of all time Yohan Blake did not start the semi-final round.  The world leader coming into this was 18-year-old Erriyon Knighton with a 19.49. Alexander Ogando set a national record to win heat 1, Knighton won heat 3 and defending champion Noah Lyles won semi 2 ahead of the next fastest qualifier Kenny Bednarek, putting those four in the center of the track for the final.  The first six qualifiers ran under 20 in the semis.

In the final, Knighton had lane 3, Ogando 4, Bednarek 5 and Lyles 6. In the past Lyles had been slow to start, depending on his superior top end speed to win at the end. That strategy also resulted in him "only" getting the bronze medal in the Olympics.  Here, Lyles was fast at the start, making up the stagger on also notoriously slow starting Joseph Fahnbulleh just past the halfway point in the turn.  Only Bednarek was able to stay close.  Coming onto the straightaway, Lyles was up a metre on Bednarek who had another metre on Knighton.  Lyles turned on the top end jets and pulled away.  Knighton also accelerated, closing on Bednarek, while holding off the fast close of Fahnbulleh for the bronze.

Lyles 19.31 broke Michael Johnson's American Record set winning the 1996 Olympics to become the third fastest 200 runner of all time. Additionally, bronze medalist Knighton became the youngest medalist in the 200 metres in Championship history.

Records
Before the competition records were as follows:

Qualification standard
The standard to qualify automatically for entry was 20.24.

Schedule
The event schedule, in local time (UTC−7), was as follows:

Results

Heats 
The first 3 athletes in each heat (Q) and the next 3 fastest (q) qualify for the semi-finals.

Wind:Heat 1: +1.0 m/s, Heat 2: 0.0 m/s, Heat 3: +2.1 m/s, Heat 4: +0.5 m/s, Heat 5: +0.4 m/s, Heat 6: +1.0 m/s, Heat 7: -0.3 m/s

Semi-finals 
The first 2 athletes in each heat (Q) and the next 2 fastest (q) qualify for the final.

Wind:Heat 1: -0.1 m/s, Heat 2: +1.1 m/s, Heat 3: +0.3 m/s

Final 
The final was started at 19:50 on 21 July. The results were as follows:

Wind: +0.4 m/s

References

200
200 metres at the World Athletics Championships